Richard Ziser is an American real estate investor, socially conservative political activist and politician belonging to the Republican Party.

Early life 
Ziser was born June 7, 1953, in Pomona, California, and has resided in Las Vegas, Nevada since 1991.

Education 
Ziser graduated from  California State Polytechnic University, Pomona (Cal Poly Pomona) with a BS in Industrial Engineering, 1976; then subsequently from Simon Greenleaf University in Santa Ana, CA, (now a campus of Trinity International University, with an MA in Christian Apologetics in 1989.

Career

U.S. Senate candidacy

In 2004, Ziser defeated 5 rival candidates in the Republican primary, then ran unsuccessfully for U.S. Senate against Democratic incumbent Harry Reid, losing 61%-35%. In 1998, Ziser lost his election bid to be on the Clark County, Nevada School Board.

Political activity
Ziser rose to political prominence as the leader of the effort to ban gay marriage in Nevada. He headed the Coalition for the Protection of Marriage, a successful, four-year campaign that succeeded in amending Nevada's State Constitution to define marriage as a union between "one man and one woman" in 2000.

In light of the Nevada Legislature's overriding of Governor Jim Gibbons' veto on domestic partnership legislation; due to take effect October 1, 2009. Ziser stated his intents to overturn the legislation as unconstitutional.

Ziser is also an anti-abortion activist, opposing legalized abortion by proposing a Personhood Constitutional Amendment designed to protect the "right to life," of the fetus.

See also
 Same-sex marriage law in the United States by state
 Domestic partnership
 Recognition of same-sex unions in Nevada

References

Additional sources 
 Nevada Concerned Citizens (Coalition for the Protection of Marriage)
 
 Jane Ann Morrison, "Panel dismisses complaint over political ad", Las Vegas Review-Journal, September 25, 1998
 "Petition to ban same-sex marriages cheered", Las Vegas Sun, January 5, 2000
 Kris Hill, "Bill may extend rights for gays", Las Vegas Sun, March 27, 2001
 Erin Neff, "Ziser, marriage protection organizer, runs for Senate", Las Vegas Sun, August 28, 2003
 Erin Neff and Michael Squires, "Political Notebook: Subpoenas, polygraphs part of Moncrief probe", Las Vegas Review-Journal, October 26, 2003
 Steve Sebelius-OpEd, "A very bad sign", Las Vegas Review-Journal, September 16, 2004
 Richard Ziser, "The Next Step In Marriage Protection", Desert Saints Magazine, July 2006 Issue
 Richard Fitzpatrick, "Being politically correct on Family Day 2006", Nevada Confidential, November 22, 2006
 Steve Sebelius, "Have we had enough hate yet?", Las Vegas CityLife, June 21, 2007
 Erin NefF-OpEd, "More 'protection'", Las Vegas Review-Journal, May 18, 2006
 Andrew Kiraly, "Oh, about that ruined state economy: Blame Richard Ziser, too.", Las Vegas CityLife, July 29, 2008
 Richard Lake, "Same-sex marriage ban might be costing Nevada", Las Vegas Review-Journal, July 29, 2008
 "Richard Ziser and Janine Hanson Do A Tag-Team Of Stupid At The Nevada Legislature", Vegas Tea Room, March 27, 2009
 "Domestic partnerships to be law in Nevada", United Press International, June 1, 2009
 Ed Vogel and Molly Ball, "Lawmakers override veto of domestic partner bill", The Ely News, June 6, 2009
 Martha Bellisle, "Nevada partners law to enable registered couples to adopt children", Reno Gazette-Journal, June 4, 2009
 Kathleen Hennessey, "Sen. Ensign's admission blurs conservative image", Associated Press, June 17, 2009

1953 births
Living people
American investors
People from Pomona, California
Trinity International University alumni
California State Polytechnic University, Pomona alumni
People from the Las Vegas Valley
Nevada Republicans